The Ruler's Back is the second studio album by British-American rapper Slick Rick, released in 1991 on Def Jam Recordings.

Upon its release, The Ruler's Back achieved notable chart success, peaking at number 29 on the Billboard 200, and number 18 on the Top R&B/Hip-Hop Albums chart. The album features the hit single "I Shouldn't Have Done It", which peaked at number 2 on the Hot Rap Singles.

Production
The album contains production from Vance Wright, Slick Rick and Mr. Lee.  The Ruler's Back was recorded in three weeks, while Rick was on bail before starting a jail sentence that would end in 1996.

Critical reception
The Los Angeles Times wrote that "there’s the eerie feeling that you’ve experienced something but you’re not sure what, as you might after reading a Denis Johnson novel or seeing an old Cocteau film late at night on public TV. The Ruler’s Back moves along at the speed of thought." Trouser Press called the album Rick's "most entertaining and least offensive longplayer." The Washington Post called the album "disappointing," writing that "for some reason, Rick has adopted a high-speed rapping style that undercuts his two great strengths -- humor and storytelling grace."

Track listing

Samples
"I Shouldn't Have Done It"
"The New Rap Language" by Spoonie Gee and The Treacherous Three
"La Di Da Di" by Doug E. Fresh and Slick Rick
"Think (About It)" by Lyn Collins
"It's a Boy"
"Impeach the President" by The Honey Drippers
"Mister Magic" by Grover Washington, Jr.
"King"
"Uphill Peace of Mind" by Kid Dynamite 
"La Di Da Di" by Doug E. Fresh and Slick Rick
"The Ruler's Back" by Slick Rick
"King Of Rock" by Run-DMC
"Mistakes of a Woman in Love With Other Men"
"Double Barrel" by Dave & Ansel Collins
"Think (About It)" by Lyn Collins
"I'm Broken Hearted" by James Brown
"Moses"
"Sunday Coming" by Alton Ellis
"Impeach the President" by The Honey Drippers
"Different Strokes" by Syl Johnson
"Bond" 
"Sing a Simple Song" by Please 
"Bring the Noise" by Public Enemy 
"Stoned Out of My Mind" by The Chi-Lites 
"Theme from the Planets" by Dexter Wansel 
"Do the Funky Penguin" by Rufus Thomas 
"Kool is Back" by Funk, Inc. 
"Runaway"
"Think (About It)" by Lyn Collins
"The Show" by Doug E. Fresh, Slick Rick and The Get Fresh Crew
"Ship"
"Change the Beat (Female Version)" by Fab 5 Freddy feat. Beside
"La Di Da Di" by Doug E. Fresh and Slick Rick
"Slick Rick - the Ruler"
"La Di Da Di" by Doug E. Fresh and Slick Rick 
"Top Cat"
"Funky President" by James Brown
"Rock Steady" by Aretha Franklin
"Don't Worry About It" by Jimmy "Bo" Horne
"Venus" (1991) sampled
"Venus" by Frankie Avalon
"Synthetic Substitution" by Melvin Bliss 
"Bring the Noise" by Public Enemy 
"La Di Da Di" by Doug E. Fresh and Slick Rick 
"Change the Beat (Female Version)" by Fab 5 Freddy feat. Beside
"Atomic Dog (Extended Version)" by George Clinton

Personnel 
 Slick Rick - performer, producer, executive producer
 Vance Wright  - producer, executive producer
 Mr. Lee - producer
 Russell Simmons - executive producer
 Francesca Spero - executive producer
 Darroll Gustamachio - engineer, mixing
 Thom Leinbach - Gabriel moreno - engineer, mixing
 Everett Ramos - engineer, mixing
 Rory Young - programming, engineer
 Cey Adams - design
 Jules T. Allen- Alvaro Almagro - photography

Charts

References

External links 
The Ruler's Back at Discogs
View the album's lyrics
Listen to the album on YouTube

1991 albums
Slick Rick albums
Def Jam Recordings albums